is a district located in Tokushima Prefecture, Japan.

Towns and villages
Ishii
Kamiyama

Districts in Tokushima Prefecture